Eleni Vasileiou (born 29 July 1974) is a Greek former basketball player who competed in the 2004 Summer Olympics.

References

1974 births
Living people
Greek women's basketball players
Olympic basketball players of Greece
Basketball players at the 2004 Summer Olympics
Basketball players from Piraeus